I'm About to Come Alive is the debut studio album by American country music singer David Nail. It was released on August 18, 2009 via MCA Nashville. The album, produced by Frank Liddell and Mike Wrucke, includes the singles "I'm About to Come Alive," "Red Light" and "Turning Home." Nail wrote or co-wrote four of the songs on the album.

Background
Prior to signing with MCA Nashville in 2009, Nail recorded a self-titled album in 2002 for Mercury Nashville, which is also a division of Universal Music Group Nashville. This album, despite producing a #52-peaking country single in "Memphis," was not released due to staff changes at the label.

Singles
The lead-off single is the title track, which was originally recorded by the alternative rock band Train on its 2003 album My Private Nation. Nail's rendition peaked at number 47 on Hot Country Songs in 2008. Followup "Red Light" (which was co-written by Jonathan Singleton) was released in early 2009, and in May it became Nail's first Top 40 country hit, peaking at number 7 in December 2009. "Turning Home" was released in late January 2010 as the third single. This song was co-written by Kenny Chesney, who gave the song to Nail after deciding not to record it for himself.

Frank Liddell and Mike Wrucke, the same producers who work for Miranda Lambert, produced the album. Lambert performs background vocals on the track "Strangers on a Train." Nail wrote or co-wrote four of the album's songs.

Critical reception
Chris Neal of Country Weekly magazine gave the album three-and-a-half stars out of five. He said that "Red Light" set the album's tone, which he described as "the same sort of dusky midtempo groove." The album also received a three-and-a-half star rating from Allmusic critic Thom Jurek, who said that the songs were "free of clichés" and that Nail had "so much soul in his voice that you believe every word."

Track listing

Personnel
 Chris Carmichael - strings
 Eric Darken - percussion
 Dan Dugmore - dobro, steel guitar
 Fred Eltringham - drums
 Kenny Greenberg - electric guitar
 Natalie Hemby - background vocals
 Jim Hoke - harmonica
 Jay Joyce - electric guitar
 Miranda Lambert - background vocals on "Strangers on a Train"
 Stoney LaRue - background vocals
 Chuck Leavell - Hammond B-3 organ, piano
 David Nail - lead vocals
 Russ Pahl - steel guitar
 Jeff Roach - keyboards
 Randy Scruggs - acoustic guitar
 Waddy Wachtel - acoustic guitar, electric guitar
 Glenn Worf - bass guitar
 Mike Wrucke - acoustic guitar, electric guitar, steel guitar, background vocals

Chart performance

Album

End of year charts

Singles

References

2009 debut albums
David Nail albums
MCA Records albums
Albums produced by Frank Liddell